Felix Gerritzen (6 February 1927 – 3 July 2007) was a German footballer who played as a forward for VfB Oldenburg and Preußen Münster.

References

External links
 

1927 births
2007 deaths
Sportspeople from Münster
German footballers
Association football forwards
Germany international footballers
VfB Oldenburg players
SC Preußen Münster players
Footballers from North Rhine-Westphalia